{|

{{Infobox ship career
|Hide header=
|Ship name=Elk ex Katherine
|Ship owner= 
|Ship operator=
|Ship registry=
|Ship route=
|Ship ordered=
|Ship builder=
|Ship original cost=
|Ship yard number=
|Ship way number=
|Ship laid down=
|Ship launched=
|Ship completed=1880; rebuilt 1896
|Ship christened=
|Ship acquired=
|Ship maiden voyage=
|Ship in service=
|Ship out of service= 1911
|Ship identification=164007 (as rebuilt)
|Ship fate=Burned
|Ship notes=
}}

|}Elk was a steam tug that operated on Puget Sound, and earlier, from 1880 to 1896, on Lake Washington under the name of Katherine.

 CareerElk was originally constructed at Houghton, Washington, and launched under the name Katherine. Katherine operated on Lake Washington, and by 1895, was owned by Capt J.C. O'Connor, who had been born in New York in 1846. O'Connor had been involved with steamboats on Lake Washington since 1874, when he had worked on the steamer Chehalis

In 1896, Capt. O.G. Olsen (d. 1924) bought the steamboat Katherine.  Olsen was a native of Norway who came to Pacific Coast in 1883.  Olsen rebuilt Katherine as a tug and took the vessel to Puget Sound to operate out of Tacoma as a tug under the name of Elk, the first vessel of what became the Olsen Tug Boat Company.

Stranding
In 1909, while operating under the Seattle concern of Crosbie Towing Co., Elk was towing a barge loaded with telephone cable intended for the Kitsap County Telephone Company, Elk went aground near Restoration Point.  As a result, the vessel suffered extensive damage, including breaking the tail shaft, rudder shaft and keel.  Elk was not a total loss, and the vessel was able to be removed to the King and Winge shipyard in West Seattle where repairs were made.

DispositionElk is reported to have burned in 1911.

Notes

 References 
 Newell, Gordon R., ed., H.W. McCurdy Marine History of the Pacific Northwest,  Superior Publishing Co., Seattle, WA (1966)
 Newell, Gordon R., Ships of the Inland Sea'', Superior Publishing Co., Seattle, WA (2nd Ed. 1960)
 *
 

1880 ships
Steamboats of Washington (state)
Steam tugs
Steam tugs of Washington (state)
Propeller-driven steamboats of Washington (state)